Clifton Miheso Ayisi (born 5 February 1993), sometimes mistakenly known as Clifford Miheso, is a Kenyan footballer who currently plays for Kenya Police Fc and the Kenya national team as a winger. Widely considered one of the best game influencers, Miheso is known for his creativity, speed, acceleration, vision, dribbling, passing and ability to open up the game by bringing his skills into play.

Club career

Early career
Miheso was born in Kakamega, Kenya, in a middle class family. He began his career in the Kenyan Premier League, where he played for Thika United from 2011 to 2013, before joining Sofapaka and spending a further three seasons with the club.

VPS
On 5 March 2015, it was announced that Miheso joined Finnish Veikkausliiga side Vaasan Palloseura (VPS), signing a one-year contract after spending three months with the club on trial.

A.F.C. Leopards
On 31 January 2016, it was announced that Miheso would return to Kenya, joining Premier League giants A.F.C. Leopards on a six-month contract.

Golden Arrows
On 4 July 2016, Miheso joined South African side Golden Arrows ahead of the 2016–17 season. He made his debut on 24 August 2016 in a 3–1 loss to Kaizer Chiefs coming in a substitute in the 62nd minute.

Buildcon Football Club
In March 2017, Clifton Miheso signed in Builddon FC in Zambian Superleague.

International career
Miheso made his debut for the Kenya national team in a friendly match against Egypt on 27 February 2012. He scored his first goal for the Harambee Stars in a 5–0 friendly win over Botswana on 27 July 2012. Miheso was on the squad that reached the final of the 2012 CECAFA Cup in Uganda, as well as the squad that won the title the following year on home soil.

International goals
Scores and results list  Kenya's goal tally first.

References

External links
 
 
 Clifton Miheso at ZeroZero

1993 births
Living people
People from Kakamega
Kenyan footballers
Association football wingers
Kenya international footballers
Thika United F.C. players
Sofapaka F.C. players
Vaasan Palloseura players
A.F.C. Leopards players
Lamontville Golden Arrows F.C. players
Clube Olímpico do Montijo players
Gor Mahia F.C. players
Kenyan expatriate footballers
Kenyan expatriate sportspeople in Finland
Kenyan expatriate sportspeople in South Africa
Kenyan expatriate sportspeople in Zambia
Kenyan expatriate sportspeople in Portugal
Expatriate footballers in Finland
Expatriate soccer players in South Africa
Expatriate footballers in Zambia
Expatriate footballers in Portugal
Buildcon F.C. players